Stramonita biserialis is a species of sea snail, a marine gastropod mollusk in the family Muricidae, the murex snails or rock snails.

Description

Distribution
This marine species occurs in the Pacific Ocean off Mexico.

References

 Blainville H.M.D. de , 1832. Disposition méthodique des espèces récentes et fossiles des genres Pourpre, Ricinule, Licorne et Concholépas de M. de Lamarck et description des espèces nouvelles ou peu connues, faisant partie de la collection du Muséum d'Histoire naturelle de Paris. Nouvelles Annales du Muséum d'Histoire naturelle 1: 189-264
 Fischer-Piette, E. & Beigbeder, J., 1943. Catalogue des types de gastéropodes marins conservés au laboratoire de Malacologie. II. - Tritonalia ; Thyphis ; Trophon. Bulletin du Muséum national d'Histoire naturelle 2° série, 15(5): 324-328
 Claremont M., Williams S.T., Barraclough T.G. & Reid D.G. (2011) The geographic scale of speciation in a marine snail with high dispersal potential. Journal of Biogeography 38: 1016-1032
 Claremont M., Vermeij G.J., Williams S.T. & Reid D.G. (2013) Global phylogeny and new classification of the Rapaninae (Gastropoda: Muricidae), dominant molluscan predators on tropical rocky seashores. Molecular Phylogenetics and Evolution 66: 91–102.

External links
 Herbert G.S., Pio M.J., Pastorino G., Harasewych M.G., Kantor Yu.I., Lamy D. & Pointier J.-P. (2015). Morphological development of the radula of four species of the neogastropod family Muricidae. Malacologia. 58(1-2): 323-336

Stramonita
Gastropods described in 1832